Thai Lion Mentari Co. Ltd, trading as Thai Lion Air, is a Thai low-cost airline, operating with Thai partners as an associate company of Lion Air of Indonesia. The carrier operates from Bangkok's Don Mueang International Airport, with plans to serve domestic and international scheduled flights from other cities in Thailand. Its head office is in the Don Mueang District, Bangkok.

History
Its inaugural flight was on December 4, 2013 on Bangkok - Chiang Mai route, with full services one day later. Thai Lion Air concluded the agreement with fellow Lion Air subsidiary Malindo Air on December 10, 2013, allowing both carriers to serve the flight between Kuala Lumpur–International and Bangkok.

Destinations

Fleet

Current fleet

, the Thai Lion Air fleet consists of the following aircraft:

Former fleet
The airline fleet previously included the following aircraft as of May 2021:

References

External links

 
 Official Thai Lion Air Holidays website
 Global Lion Air

Thai companies established in 2013
Airlines established in 2013
Airlines of Thailand
Companies based in Bangkok
Lion Air
Low-cost carriers